Arsalan Mir (born 5 November 1983) is a Pakistani first-class cricketer who played for Lahore cricket team.

References

External links
 

1983 births
Living people
Pakistani cricketers
Lahore cricketers
Cricketers from Lahore